The 1989 Hi-Tec Women's British Open Squash Championships was held at East Grinstead and the Wembley Squash Centre in London from 12–17 April 1989. Susan Devoy won her sixth consecutive title defeating Martine Le Moignan in the final.

Seeds

Draw and results

First round

Second round

Third round

Quarter-finals

Semi-finals

Final

References

Women's British Open Squash Championships
Women's British Open Squash Championship
Women's British Open Squash Championship
Squash competitions in London
Women's British Open Squash Championship
British Open Squash Championship
Women's British Open Squash Championship